Paul Claudon (5 September 1919 – 5 July 2002) was a French film producer and actor. He produced 25 films between 1952 and 1998. He was a member of the jury at the 21st Berlin International Film Festival and the 1979 Cannes Film Festival.

Selected filmography
Rumours (1947)
 Women Are Angels (1952) 
 The Goose of Sedan (1959)
 Yo Yo (1965)
 The Great Love (1969)
 The Wedding Ring (1971)
 Going Places (1974)
 One-Eyed Men Are Kings  (1974)

References

External links

1919 births
2002 deaths
French film producers
French male film actors
20th-century French male actors